Loria may refer to:

Places 

Loria, Veneto, a town in the province of Treviso, northern Italy
Loria (Buenos Aires Underground), a station on Line A of the Buenos Aires Underground
River Loria, Grenada

Persons
Achille Loria (1867–1943), Italian Jewish economist and sociologist
Christopher Loria (born 1960), American astronaut
David Loria (born 1981), Kazakh football goalkeeper
Frank Loria (1947–1970), American football player
Gino Loria (1862–1954), Italian mathematician and historian of mathematics
Giorgi Loria (born 1986), Georgian footballer
Jeffrey Loria (born 1940), art dealer and baseball club owner
Lamberto Loria (1855–1913), Italian ethnographer
Leonardo Loria (born 1999), Italian footballer
Mariano Sánchez de Loria (1774–1842), Bolivian statesman
Marvin Loría (born 1997), Costa Rican footballer 
Simone Loria (born 1976), Italian footballer
Vincenzo Loria (1850–1939), Italian painter

Other 

Loria, Formula 1 racing driver Sebastian Vettel's 2018 car (Ferrari SF71H)
Loria, a French computer science research laboratory located in Nancy, France